Year of birth missing
Year of death missing
Members of the Imperial Legislative Council of India
Members of the Council of State (India)
Parsi people
People from Mumbai
1938 deaths
Officers of the Order of the British Empire
Indian Knights Bachelor
Knights Bachelor
Indian justices of the peace
University of Mumbai alumni
Indian businesspeople
Sir Phiroze Cursetjee Sethna, OBE, JP (8 October 1866 – 16 September 1938), also spelled Pheroze, was an Indian businessman and political figure. He was a member of the Imperial Legislative Council and later a member of the Central Legislative Assembly and Council of State.

References